The Grand Lodge of North Dakota, Ancient Order of United Workmen is a building in Fargo, North Dakota, that was built in 1914 in Early Commercial style.  It was designed by architects Haxby & Gillespie.  Also known as the Fossum Building and as Interstate Business College, it was listed on the National Register of Historic Places in 1979.

It served historically as a clubhouse of the Ancient Order of United Workmen and as a business.

The building is significant in the history of Fargo and North Dakota, and also significant architecturally.

See also
 Ancient Order of United Workmen Temple (1892), Portland, Oregon
 New Glarus Town Hall, New Glarus, Wisconsin

References

1914 establishments in North Dakota
Ancient Order of United Workmen
Buildings and structures completed in 1914
Buildings and structures in Fargo, North Dakota
Clubhouses on the National Register of Historic Places in North Dakota
National Register of Historic Places in Cass County, North Dakota
Individually listed contributing properties to historic districts on the National Register in North Dakota
University and college buildings on the National Register of Historic Places in North Dakota
Buildings designated early commercial in the National Register of Historic Places in North Dakota